Timoor Daghistani (born 4 January 1949, Baghdad) served as the Jordanian ambassador to the United Kingdom.

Biography
Son of Major-General Ghazi al-Daghistani, CVO, former ADC to King Faisal II of Iraq, and paternal grandson of Fieldmarshal Muhammad Fadhil al-Daghistani.

Education
 Bethany School, Goudhurst, Kent.
 Staff College, Camberley.
 Royal Military Academy Sandhurst.

Career
 2nd-Lieutenant of the Jordan Arab Army.
 Director of Training Armoured Corps.
 Assistant Military Attaché, Washington D.C. (1980-1983) [retired 1986]. 
 Assistant Director of the Information Bureau, Washington D.C. (1986-1993).
 Ambassador to Spain (1994-1999).
 Ambassador at the Court of St James's (since 1999).

His military grade is Colonel.

Personal life

He was married to Princess Basma bint Talal of Jordan in Amman, on 2 April 1970 and had two children together: 
 Farah Daghistani (born 25 March 1972), married 23 September 2004 Saud Abdul Aziz Suleiman.
 Ghazi Daghistani (born 21 July 1974), married on 7 September 2006 Samanta Mahdi Saifi.

In the late 1970s, they divorced and Basma went on to marry Sayyid Walid al-Kurdi on 14 April 1980.

Honours 
 Order of the Jordanian Star 1st Class
 Order of Al Istiqlal 1st Class

Foreign Honours 

 Honorary Knight Grand Cross of the Royal Victorian Order [GCVO] (United Kingdom, 6.11.2001).
 Member of the Royal Order of the Intare (Rwanda).
 Order of the Sacred Treasure !st Class (Japan).
 Al Merito Civil 1st Class (Spain).
 Military order of St George 3rd Class (Tonga)

References

External links
Official website of the Jordanian Embassy to the United Kingdom

1949 births
Jordanian diplomats
Ambassadors of Jordan to the United Kingdom
Honorary Knights Grand Cross of the Royal Victorian Order
Graduates of the Royal Military Academy Sandhurst
Living people
Ambassadors of Jordan to Spain